Ancient Temple, Ladhoo, is located in the middle of a natural fed pond or spring known as Sanz Haer Nag or Sanyasar Nag in Ladhoo, a village in the Pulwama district of the southern part of the Kashmir Valley of the Indian union territory of Jammu and Kashmir.

The temple is listed among List of Monuments of National Importance in Jammu and Kashmir. It has also been attributed by other including, Sun Temple or Jeevanath Temple or Shiv temple, but these names found no historical proof. Thus, the monument remained entitled as 'The Ancient Temple, Ladhoo' in the documents of Archaeological Survey of India.

This temple is externally square and internally circular in shape. The entrance which faces the southwest has a arch surmounted pediment. This archaeological monument is datable to circa 8th century A.D. The monument and the pond including a small park is fenced and maintained by Archaeological Survey of India, circle srinagar, Jammu.

References 

Hindu temples in Jammu and Kashmir
Archaeological sites in Jammu and Kashmir
8th-century Hindu temples
All Wikipedia articles written in Indian English
Articles with short description
Short description matches Wikidata
Coordinates on Wikidata
Pulwama district